Las Número 1 de Mijares (in English Mijares' Number Ones) the ninth compilation album by Mexican pop singer Mijares. It was released in 2005.

Track listing
Tracks:
 Poco a Poco
 Bella
 A Corazón Abierto
 Soñador
 Para Amarnos Más
 No Se Murió El Amor
 No Hace Falta
 Uno Entre Mil
 Soldado Del Amor
 Encadenado
 Corazón Salvaje
 El Breve Espacio
 Persona a Persona
 Que Puedo Hacer Yo Con Tanto Amor
 Baño De Mujeres

2005 greatest hits albums
Manuel Mijares compilation albums